The Bombardment of Odessa was an action during the Crimean War in which a joint Anglo-French squadron of warships attacked the Russian port of Odessa.

Background and formation
On 6 April 1854, soon after the declaration of war by Britain and France on Russia, the British steam frigate , under the command of Captain William Loring, sailed to Odessa and sent a boat into the port under a flag of truce to collect the British Consul there. When leaving the port the boat was fired upon by the Russians. The British naval commander Vice-Admiral James Dundas demanded an explanation from Lieutenant-General Dmitri Osten-Sacken, the military governor of Odessa, for this breach of the laws of war. His reply was considered unacceptable, so a squadron was quickly selected to mount a punitive expedition.

An article by Karl Marx, printed in the New York Daily Tribune of 16 May 1854, reported that the Russians had claimed that the Furious was actually carrying out a covert reconnaissance of the port, as the Retribution had done some time earlier, entering the port of Sevastopol under the pretext of delivering dispatches, but also making a survey of the defences, as had been admitted by the British press. Marx also pointed out the "ridiculousness" of the Allies requiring such justifications for launching an attack on an enemy naval base in a time of war.

and the French screw corvette Caton.

The bombardment

On 22 April the Anglo-French fleet arrived off Odessa, and lay offshore. Vauban was hit by a red-hot shot that started a fire aboard and was obliged to temporarily withdraw. She soon returned, bringing the screw corvette Caton with her. The second division (Furious, Terrible, Retribution and Mogador) then joined the attack, while Arethusa, Highflyer and Sans Pareil remained further offshore as a reserve. The attacking ships now anchored closer in, and it was not long before a shot from Terrible hit a magazine on the Imperial Mole, which exploded causing great damage. About 24 Russian ships in the military port were set on fire, and several British and French merchant ships detained there took advantage of the confusion to escape. Meanwhile, the rocket-boats set fire to the dockyard storehouses. Late in the action the Arethusa, under the command of Captain William Robert Mends, engaged batteries on the south side of the Quarantine Mole, until recalled. As numerous fires were now threatening the town, the attack was ended at 5.30 p.m., and the squadron withdrew.

Casualties were very light; two killed and one wounded in Vauban, three wounded in Retribution, six wounded in Sampson, and one killed and four wounded in Terrible.

Effects
As a result of this "affair of honour", Odessa was essentially neutralised as a naval base, and remained so for the rest of the war, allowing the Allies to operate in the Black Sea with impunity and to thus maintain their supply lines following the subsequent invasion of the Crimean Peninsula in September.

Order of battle

First Division
 HMS Sampson (6 guns), Captain Lewis Tobias Jones. 
 HMS Tiger (16 guns), Captain Henry Wells Giffard.
 Vauban (20 guns), Captaine de Poucques d'Herbinghem.
 Descartes (20 guns), Captaine Darricau.
Boat Division
 Six ship's boats armed with 24-pounder rockets, Commander J. B. Dickson.

Second Division
 HMS Furious (16 guns), Captain William Loring.
 HMS Terrible (21 guns), Captain James Johnstone McCleverty.
 HMS Retribution (28 guns), Captain the Hon. James Robert Drummond.
 Mogador (28 guns), Captaine Warnier de Wailly.
Reserve
 HMS Arethusa (50 guns), Captain William Robert Mends.
 HMS Sans Pareil (70 guns), Captain Sidney Colpoys Dacres.
 HMS Highflyer (21 guns), Captain John Moore.
 Caton (8 guns), Captaine Pothuau.

References
Notes

Bibliography
 
 

Odessa
Odessa
Odessa
Odessa
Odessa
1854 in the Russian Empire
Kherson Governorate
April 1854 events